The 1986 German Grand Prix was a Formula One motor race held at the Hockenheimring on 27 July 1986. It was the tenth race of the 1986 Formula One World Championship.

The 45-lap race was won by Brazilian driver Nelson Piquet, driving a Williams-Honda. Compatriot Ayrton Senna was second in a Lotus-Renault, with Briton Nigel Mansell third in the other Williams-Honda. Frenchman Alain Prost was running third in his McLaren-TAG in the closing laps when he ran out of fuel, dropping him to sixth and thus allowing Mansell to extend his lead in the Drivers' Championship to seven points.

Pre-race
In the run-up to the race, Keke Rosberg announced that he would be retiring from Formula One at the end of the season, while Lotus announced that they would be using Honda engines in 1987, following Renault's withdrawal from the sport, with Japanese driver Satoru Nakajima replacing Johnny Dumfries. Meanwhile, Ligier drafted in Philippe Alliot to replace the injured Jacques Laffite.

Classification

Qualifying

Race

Championship standings after the race

Drivers' Championship standings

Constructors' Championship standings

References

German Grand Prix
German Grand Prix
German Grand Prix
German Grand Prix